Holden Commodore SS is one of the following models of car:
 Commodore SS sports variant of Holden Commodore (VH), the third iteration of the first generation of this car (1982–1984)
 Commodore SS sports variant of Holden Commodore (VK), the fourth iteration of the first generation of this car (1984–1986)
 Commodore SS sports variant of Holden Commodore (VL), the fifth iteration of the first generation of this car (1986–1988)
 Commodore SS sports variant of Holden Commodore (VN), the first iteration of the second generation of this car (1988–1991)
 Commodore SS sports variant of Holden Commodore (VP), the second iteration of the second generation of this car (1991–1993)
 Commodore SS sports variant of Holden Commodore (VR), the third iteration of the second generation of this car (1993–1995)
 Commodore SS sports variant of Holden Commodore (VS), the fourth iteration of the second generation of this car (1995–1997)
 Commodore SS sports variant of Holden Commodore (VT), the first iteration of the third generation of this car (1997–2000)
 Commodore SS sports variant of Holden Commodore (VX), the second iteration of the third generation of this car (2000–2002)
 Commodore SS sports variant of Holden Commodore (VY), the third iteration of the third generation of this car (2002–2004)
 Commodore SS sports variant of Holden Commodore (VZ), the fourth iteration of the third generation of this car (2004–2006)
 Commodore SS sports variant of Holden Commodore (VE), the first iteration of the fourth generation of this car (2006–2013)
 Commodore SS sports variant of Holden Commodore (VF), the second iteration of the fourth generation of this car (2013–2017)

See also 
 Holden SS, about the 'SS' designator as used by GM Holden Ltd in their cars
 Chevrolet SS, an export version of the VF-generation Holden Commodore SS
 Chevrolet SS (concept car), a 2003 concept car unrelated to Holden Commodore SS